Protein Jade-3 is a protein that in humans is encoded by the PHF16 gene.

This gene is part of a gene cluster on chromosome Xp11.23. The encoded protein contains a zinc finger motif often found in transcriptional regulators, however, its exact function is not known. Alternative splicing results in multiple transcript variants encoding the same protein.

References

Further reading

External links 
 

Transcription factors